Schlessinger is a German surname meaning "from Silesia" (German: Schlesien) and may refer to:

 Schlessinger Media, educational video distributor

People
 Andrew Schlessinger, founder of Schlessinger Media, a division of Library Video Company
 Arthur M. Schlesinger Sr., American historian and professor at Harvard University
 David Schlessinger, founder of Encore Books, Zany Brainy, and Five Below retail store chains
 David Schlessinger (geneticist) (born 1936), Canadian-born American biochemist, microbiologist, and geneticist
 Joseph Schlessinger, pharmacologist at Yale; co-founder of SUGEN, a drug development company now part of Pfizer
 Laura (Catherine) Schlessinger, a.k.a. "Dr. Laura" (born 1947), radio host for a popular therapy call-in show
 Leonard Schlessinger, husband of Rose Coyle and National General Manager of the Warner Bros. Theatres
 Michael Schlessinger, American mathematician.

Schleßinger 
 Leopold Schleßinger, rabbi, see

Šlesingr 
 Michal Šlesingr (born 1983, Ústí nad Orlicí, Eastern Bohemia), a Czech biathlete

See also 
 Schlesinger
 Shlesinger
 Slesinger

German-language surnames
German toponymic surnames
Jewish surnames
Surnames of Silesian origin
Silesian Jews
Yiddish-language surnames
Ethnonymic surnames